Soriano is a Spanish-language surname, meaning one from the city of Soria (in Spain). It also occur in other languages with various meanings. 

It may refer to:

People
 Alfonso Soriano (born 1976), Dominican baseball player
 Andrés Soriano (1898–1964), Philippine industrialist
 Antero Soriano (1888–1929), Philippine senator
 Bruno Soriano (born 1984), Spanish footballer
 Christopher Soriano, Jr. (born 1997), American rapper known professionally as CJ
 Dewey Soriano (1920–1998), baseball executive
 Edward Soriano (born 1946), lieutenant-general, U.S. Army
 Elia Soriano (born 1989), German-Italian footballer
 Eliseo "Eli" Soriano (1947–2021), Philippine religious broadcaster
 Francesco Soriano (1548/49–1621), Italian renaissance composer
 Joan Soriano (born 1972), Dominican bachata singer and guitarist
 Jonathan Soriano (born 1985), Spanish footballer
 José Soriano (footballer) (1917–2011), Peruvian footballer
 Juan Soriano (artist) (1920–2006), Mexican painter and sculptor
 Juan Soriano (footballer) (born 1997), Spanish footballer
 Marc Soriano (1918–1994), French philosopher and writer
 Mari Cruz Soriano (born 1955), Spanish entrepreneur and presenter
 Maricel Soriano (born 1965), Filipina actress
 Meryll Soriano (born 1982), Filipina actress
 Osvaldo Soriano (1943–1997), Argentine journalist and writer
 Pepe Soriano (born 1929), Argentine actor and playwright
 Peter Soriano (born 1959), Philippine-born French-American artist
 Rafael Soriano (born 1979), Dominican baseball pitcher for the Washington Nationals
 Rafael Soriano (painter) (1920––2015), Cuban painter
 Raphael Soriano (1904–1988), Greek-born U.S. architect
 Roberto Soriano (born 1991), German-Italian footballer
 Vicente Soriano (born 1953), Valencian businessman and president of Valencia CF
 Waldick Soriano (1933–2008), Brazilian singer-songwriter

See also
Soriano (disambiguation)

Spanish-language surnames